Nemanja Jovanović (born on 3 March 1984) is a Serbian former football striker.

Career statistics

Honours
Vaslui 
UEFA Intertoto Cup (1): 2008

References

External links

1984 births
Living people
Serbian footballers
Serbian expatriate footballers
Red Star Belgrade footballers
FK Železnik players
FC Universitatea Cluj players
FC Vaslui players
CSM Unirea Alba Iulia players
FC Unirea Urziceni players
FC Argeș Pitești players
SCM Râmnicu Vâlcea players
CS Pandurii Târgu Jiu players
Liga I players
Liga II players
Association football forwards
FC Kairat players
FC Spartak Semey players
Sandnes Ulf players
FC AGMK players
FC Taraz players
Kazakhstan Premier League players
Uzbekistan Super League players
Eliteserien players
Serbian expatriate sportspeople in Romania
Expatriate footballers in Romania
Expatriate footballers in Norway
Expatriate footballers in Kazakhstan
Expatriate footballers in Uzbekistan
People from Negotin